34th Street station may refer to:

 34th Street station (Market–Frankford Line), a rapid transit station in Philadelphia
 34th Street station (SEPTA Route 15), a trolley stop in Philadelphia
 34th Street (IRT Second Avenue Line), a former station
 34th Street (IRT Third Avenue Line),  a former station
 34th Street (IRT Ninth Avenue Line), a former station
 34th Street–Herald Square (New York City Subway), a station complex
 34th Street–Hudson Yards (IRT Flushing Line)
 34th Street (HBLR station) in Bayonne, New Jersey
 34th Street–Penn Station (IND Eighth Avenue Line)
 34th Street–Penn Station (IRT Broadway–Seventh Avenue Line)

See also
34th Street (disambiguation)